John Odigie Oyegun (born 12 August 1939) is a Nigerian politician who served as the first national chairman of All Progressives Congress (APC) in Nigeria. He was also the Executive Governor of Edo State between 1992 and 1993, during the aborted Nigerian Third Republic.

Oyegun led then opposition APC and Muhammad Buhari to victory in 2015 after defeating ruling People's Democratic Party, PDP and President Goodluck Jonathan. It was the first time an incumbent president and a ruling party was defeated in a presidential poll in Nigeria.

Background

John Odigie Oyegun was born on 12 August 1939, in Warri, Delta State to an Edo father and Urhobo mother from Agbarha Ughelli. He attended St. Patrick's College, Asaba, and then  went to the University of Ibadan where he obtained a bachelor's degree in Economics. He then served in various capacities as a federal civil servant working as a development planner.

Political career

Chief John Oyegun was elected as civilian governor of Edo State on the SDP platform, during the transition to democracy launched by General Ibrahim Babangida and served from January 1992 to November 1993. He was removed from office after General Sani Abacha seized power.
Later, he became a leader of the All Nigeria Peoples Party (ANPP). In 2009 he was chairman of the Technical Working Committee of CODER.

On 13 June 2014 Odigie-Oyegun was elected as national chairman of the APC.
Bola Tinubu of Lagos State, the APC national leader, is thought to have played an important role in the decision.
The choice of Oyegun, from the mostly Christian south of the country, was calculated to win both Christian and Moslem votes in the challenge to President Goodluck Jonathan's People's Democratic Party (PDP). In 2017 Odigie-Oyegun came under intense criticism of various factions of the party including some powerful group of APC Governors for his handling of the party calling for his removal from office as national chairman of the party. President Muhammadu Buhari, the leader of the party and seven of its governors backed Odigie-Oyegun to remain in office. President Buhari later withdrew his support for Odigie-Oyegun when it became clear that most of the governors and other powerful members of the party were resolute in their efforts to remove Odigie-Oyegun from office and install a successor Adams Oshiomhole from same state as Odigie-Oyegun. Odigie-Oyegun stepped down from office of the National Chairman of the party by not seeking re-election for a second term in office at the 2018 elective national convention of the party leaving Adams Oshiomhole his opponent the sole candidate for the position.

References

1939 births
Living people
People from Warri
Governors of Edo State
All Nigeria Peoples Party politicians
All Progressives Congress politicians
Candidates in the Nigerian general election, 2011
Leaders of political parties in Nigeria
University of Ibadan alumni
Edo people
Urhobo people